Charles J. Fisher is an American published author and Los Angeles-based historic preservation activist who has successfully nominated more than 170 historic buildings as City of Los Angeles Historic-Cultural Monuments, as well as designated historic buildings for the County of Ventura and in the cities of Glendale, Monrovia, Ojai and Sierra Madre.

Fisher, a native Angeleno, together with other historical preservation advocates, founded the Highland Park Heritage Trust in 1982 to halt the demolition of pristine Craftsman and Mission Revival homes in favor of low-quality, high-density apartment structures. The Heritage Trust historic survey assessed hundreds of properties to create the Highland Park Historic Preservation Overlay Zone (Highland Park-Garvanza HPOZ), the largest Historic Preservation Overlay Zone in the city of Los Angeles. Fisher has served three times as president of the Heritage Trust, and serves on the Highland Park HPOZ board.

Fisher has worked in conjunction with the Los Angeles Conservancy, the Highland Park Heritage Trust, various historical societies, and numerous Los Angeles neighborhood councils, resident's groups, community groups, and advocacy groups to preserve Los Angeles' unique historic architectural and cultural legacy.

He also the author of two books, Highland Park (2008) and Garvanza (2010), both published by Arcadia Press.  He is working on a comprehensive book giving a history of each of the Los Angeles City Historic Cultural Monuments.

Successful monument nominations

References

External links
 

Writers from Los Angeles
Historical preservationists
Living people
Year of birth missing (living people)